Madison is an unincorporated community in Newcombe Rural Municipality No. 260, Saskatchewan, Canada. The community had a population of 10 in 2001. It previously held the status of village until February 1, 1998. The hamlet is located 20 km west of the Town of Eston on highway 44 along the Canadian National Railway subdivision.

History
Prior to February 1, 1998, Madison was incorporated as a village, and was restructured as a hamlet under the jurisdiction of the Rural municipality of Newcombe that date.

See also

List of communities in Saskatchewan
Hamlets of Saskatchewan

References

Newcombe No. 260, Saskatchewan
Former villages in Saskatchewan
Unincorporated communities in Saskatchewan
Populated places disestablished in 1998